Anastomophleps claosticha is a moth in the family Cossidae, and the only species in the genus Anastomophleps. It is found in Argentina.

References

Natural History Museum Lepidoptera generic names catalog

Cossidae
Moths of South America